Steve Joseph Nemeth (December 10, 1922 – March 27, 1998) was an American football quarterback who played two seasons in the All-America Football Conference (AAFC) with the Chicago Rockets and Baltimore Colts. He played college football at the University of Notre Dame and attended James Whitcomb Riley High School in South Bend, Indiana. He was also a member of the Cleveland Rams, Montreal Alouettes and Detroit Lions.

Early years
Nemeth played high school football at James Whitcomb Riley High School. He earned All-State honors in 1940 and 1941. He was inducted into the Indiana Football Hall of Fame on August 15, 1987.

College career
Nemeth played for the Notre Dame Fighting Irish from 1943 to 1944.

Professional career
Nemeth played in nine games, starting four, for the Cleveland Rams of the National Football League (NFL) in 1945. He played in thirteen games, starting one, for the Chicago Rockets of the AAFC during the 1946 season. He played in four games, starting one, for the AAFC's Baltimore Colts in 1947. Nemeth played in eleven games for the Montreal Alouettes of the Canadian Football League in 1948. He spent the 1949 off-season with the NFL's Detroit Lions and was released by the team on August 4, 1949.

Coaching career
Nemeth joined the Notre Dame Fighting Irish as an assistant coach after his professional football career.

References

External links
Just Sports Stats
College stats

1922 births
1998 deaths
American football quarterbacks
American football placekickers
Canadian football quarterbacks
Canadian football placekickers
American players of Canadian football
American people of Hungarian descent
Notre Dame Fighting Irish football players
Cleveland Rams players
Chicago Rockets players
Baltimore Colts (1947–1950) players
Montreal Alouettes players
Detroit Lions players
Notre Dame Fighting Irish football coaches
Players of American football from South Bend, Indiana